Kenth Karlsson (born 21 December 1957) is a Swedish water polo player. He competed in the men's tournament at the 1980 Summer Olympics.

References

External links
 

1957 births
Living people
Swedish male water polo players
Olympic water polo players of Sweden
Water polo players at the 1980 Summer Olympics
Sportspeople from Västerås